Pigadia (Greek: Πηγάδια meaning "wells") may refer to several locations in Greece:

Pigadia, Karpathos, the main town and port of Karpathos
Pigadia, Drama, a village in the Drama regional unit
Pigadia, Argolis, a village in Argolis 
Pigadia, Laconia, a village in Laconia 
Pigadia, Messenia, a village in Messenia 
Pigadia, Xanthi, a village in the Xanthi regional unit
3-5 Pigadia, a ski resort near Naousa, Imathia

See also
Battle of Pente Pigadia - a battle of the First Balkan War between the Ottomans and the Greeks